Ricardo Oscare (born 16 June 1975) is an Argentine biathlete. He competed in the men's 20 km individual event at the 2002 Winter Olympics.

References

External links
 

1975 births
Living people
Argentine male biathletes
Olympic biathletes of Argentina
Biathletes at the 2002 Winter Olympics
Sportspeople from Mendoza Province